On the Prowl is the ninth studio album released by the Japanese heavy metal band Loudness. It is also their second and last album with American vocalist Mike Vescera, before his leaving to join Yngwie Malmsteen's band. On the Prowl is mainly a compilation of self-covers of songs from early Loudness' albums, containing only three new songs written by the band (♠). However, Mike Vescera translated and adapted the lyrics of the old songs written by former vocalist Minoru Niihara, to be sung in English.

Track listing
All music by Akira Takasaki. The lyrics for all the new songs and "Find a Way" written by Mike Vescera, except for "Love Toys" by Vescera/Dearnley. Other lyrics by Minoru Niihara.

"Down 'n' Dirty" ♠ - 4:36 
"Playin' Games" ♠ - 3:47
"Love Toys" ♠ - 4:02
"Never Again" - 5:01  (cover of "Silent Sword", b-side of the single "Risky Woman")
"Deadly Player" - 4:47 (cover of "Lonely Player", from the album Devil Soldier)
"Take It or Leave It" - 4:31 (cover of "Milky Way", from the album Disillusion)
"Girl" - 4:20 (cover of "Girl", from the album Devil Soldier)
"Long Distance" - 4:15 (cover of "Long Distance Love", from the EP Jealousy)
"In the Mirror" - 3:34 (cover of "In the Mirror", from the album The Law of Devil's Land)
"Sleepless Nights" - 4:39 (cover of "Sleepless Night", from the album The Law of Devil's Land)
"Find a Way" - 7:31 (cover of "To Be Demon", from the album The Birthday Eve)

Personnel
Loudness
Michael Vescera - vocals
Akira Takasaki - guitars
Masayoshi Yamashita - bass 
Munetaka Higuchi - drums

Additional musicians
Jim Wilkas - keyboards
Nat, Gary and Chris Vescera, Marty Earley - backing vocals

Production
Mark Dearnley - producer, engineer, mixing at Capitol Studios, Los Angeles
Charles Paakkari, Chris Rich, Jesse Henderson - assistant engineers
Bob Ludwig - mastering
George Azuma - supervisor
Tokugen Yamamoto - executive producer

References

Loudness (band) albums
1991 albums
Atco Records albums
Warner Music Japan albums